Fayetteville High School is a public high school located in Fayetteville, Texas (USA). It is part of the Fayetteville Independent School District located in east central Fayette County and classified as a 1A school by the UIL.  In 2013, the school was rated "Met Standard" by the Texas Education Agency.

Athletics
The Fayetteville Lions compete in the following sports:

Baseball
Basketball
Cross Country
Golf
Softball
Tennis
Track and Field
Volleyball

State Titles
Baseball 
1997(1A), 2012(1A), 2021 (1A)
Girls Basketball  
2004(1A/D1)
Volleyball
2021(1A)

References

External links
 Fayetteville ISD

Schools in Fayette County, Texas
Public high schools in Texas